The  is a DC electric multiple unit (EMU) train type operated by West Japan Railway Company (JR-West) on limited express services on the Kinokuni Line (Kisei Main Line) in Japan.

Design
Built jointly by Hitachi, Kawasaki Heavy Industries, and Nippon Sharyo, two six-car and two three-car sets were built, and introduced on 31 July 1996 to improve travel times on the Kuroshio limited-express service.

Formations

3-car sets

6-car sets
The six-car sets are formed as follows.

Cars 3 and 5 each have one single-arm pantograph.

References

External links

 jr-odekake.net Kuroshio (Ocean Arrow) 283 series 

Electric multiple units of Japan
West Japan Railway Company
Tilting trains
Train-related introductions in 1996
Hitachi multiple units
Kawasaki multiple units
1500 V DC multiple units of Japan
Nippon Sharyo multiple units